Abdal Salam Al-Dabaji (born 24 April 1979 in Gaza) he is a retired athlete who competed internationally for Palestine.

He represented Palestine at the 2004 Summer Olympics in Athens. He competed in the 800 metres where he finished 8th in his heat and so failing to advance.

References

External links
 

1979 births
Living people
Palestinian male middle-distance runners
Athletes (track and field) at the 2004 Summer Olympics
Olympic athletes of Palestine
Athletes (track and field) at the 2002 Asian Games
Athletes (track and field) at the 2006 Asian Games
Asian Games competitors for Palestine